A steam-powered aircraft is an aircraft propelled by a steam engine. Steam power was used during the 19th century, but fell into disuse with the arrival of the more practical internal combustion engine at the beginning of the pioneer era.

Steam power is distinct from its use as a lifting gas in thermal airships and early balloons.

History

 1842: The Aerial Steam Carriage of William Samuel Henson and John Stringfellow was patented, but was never successful, although a steam-powered model was flown in 1848.
 1852: Henri Giffard flew a 3-horsepower (2 kW) steam-powered dirigible over Paris; it was the first powered aircraft.
 1861 Gustave Ponton d'Amécourt made a small steam-powered craft, coining the name helicopter.
 1874: Félix du Temple flew a steam-powered aluminium monoplane off a downhill run.  While it did not achieve level flight, it was the first manned heavier-than-air powered flight.
 1877: Enrico Forlanini built and flew a model steam-powered helicopter in Milan.
 1882: Alexander Mozhaisky built a steam-powered plane but it did not achieve sustained flight. The engine from the plane is in the Central Air Force Museum in Monino, Moscow.
 1890: Clément Ader built a steam-powered, bat-winged monoplane, named the Eole. His flight did prove that a heavier-than-air flight was possible. Ader made at least three further attempts, the last two on 12 and 14 October 1897 for the French Ministry of War. There is controversy about whether or not he attained controlled flight. Ader did not obtain funding for his project, and that points to its probable failure.
The machine unexpectedly generated sufficient lift and thrust to break free of the test track and fly, but was never intended to be operated as a piloted aircraft and so crashed almost immediately owing to its lack of flight controls.
 1896: Samuel Pierpont Langley successfully flew unpiloted steam-powered models.
1897: Carl Richard Nyberg's Flugan developed steam-powered aircraft over a period from 1897 to 1922, but they never achieved more than a few short hops.
 1899: Gustave Whitehead built, and was purported to have flown, a steam-powered airplane in Pittsburgh, Pennsylvania. Stoker/passenger Louis Darvarich was said to have been injured when the plane crashed into an upper story of an apartment building. Whitehead later claimed to have flown a steam aircraft in Hartford, Connecticut, and to have been visited by one of the Wright brothers well before 1903. Mainstream aviation historians remain unconvinced of the Whitehead claims. The flights have never been verified satisfactorily; there are no photographs, news stories, or other media from 1899 to confirm them. Likewise, the supposed visit of the Wright brothers to Whitehead is apocryphal; other than affidavits taken over thirty years after the fact, there is no evidence the visit ever happened.
 1902 Lyman Gilmore claimed in 1927 to have flown a steam-powered aircraft on 15 May 1902. The flight was unconfirmed.
 1920: The Bristol Tramp was to have been a steam-powered aeroplane, but the turbine was over-powered, and the construction of a reliable boiler and condenser circuit was problematic.
 1931 Harry Crossland Pfaff of Chicago designed and made a steam-powered aircraft. It was to be test flown by round-the-world aviator Clyde Pangborn. There is no record of the flight being made. 
 1933: George D. Besler and William J. Besler's prototype steam biplane, based on a Travel Air 2000, flew several times at Oakland airport. Several others were working on steam-powered flight at the time. Harold C. Johnson of Akron, Ohio, had made a  steam engine for an aircraft in autumn 1932. The Great Lakes Aircraft Company of Cleveland, Ohio, was working on a steam-powered biplane. A Paris mechanic developed a light steam-powered engine for aircraft. Swedish steam turbine engineers were working on an aircraft engine, and G. A. Raffaelli, an Italian aeronautical engineer, published a paper in 1931 on a steam-powered engine for stratospheric flight .
 1934: Newspapers of the time reported a steam-powered aircraft designed by a Mr Huettner, Chief Engineer of the Klingenberg Electric Works in Berlin, that used revolving boiler combined with a steam turbine. The Berlin reporter of the Czechoslovak Prager Tagblatt, who wrote the article, was arrested, and no more was heard of the project.<ref>Steam Car Developments and Steam Aviation, June 1934</ref>
 1938: A British company, Aero Turbines Limited, designed a steam turbine engine similar to Huettner's. The company ceased to exist in 1948.
 1944: A steam-powered version of the Messerschmitt Me 264A Amerika Bomber was hypothesized but never constructed. It was to be powered by a steam turbine developing over  while driving a -diameter propeller. The fuel would have been a mixture of powdered coal and petroleum. It seems that the steam turbines would have had an SFC of 190 gr/hp/hr. The main advantages of this powerplant were considered to be that it produced consistent power at all altitudes and required low maintenance.
 1960s: Conceptual drawings were made for Don Johnson of Thermodynamic Systems Inc., Newport Beach, California, of a steam engine to be installed in a Hughes 300 helicopter. The steam engine was a compact cylindrical double-acting uniflow (similar in layout to the Dyna-Cam Aero engine), but no prototype was ever made by Controlled Steam Dynamics, Inc.

Notes

References
  The Lore of Flight, 1986, The First Powered Hops, Historical Section, pg 38.  Taylor, John William Ransom [Ed.], Crescent Books, New York  
 Air Progress magazine, July 1969; Aeronews, p. 20 Steamed Up Over Chopper Power Daily Pilot, Thursday October 9, 1969 pg. 3 Speedy Steam Engine'' by Arthur R. Vinsel

External links

 Report on the Besler aircraft
 The Besler Steam Plane 
 Flying By Steam, by David Sarlin
 article published in Light Steam Power
 Besler Corporation Promo Film: Steam-Driven Vehicles
 "Steam Takes Wings", December 1932, Popular Science

 
Aircraft engines